Van Leeuwen is a Dutch toponymic surname meaning "from Leeuwen". In 2007, nearly 28,000 people in the Netherlands carried the name, making it the 18th most common name there. There are two places named Leeuwen in Gelderland (Leeuwen and a hamlet absorbed in Wageningen) and two in Limburg (near Roermond and near Reuver). Considering the high frequency of the name and the small size of these two places, it has been speculated that people from many other places, such as the relatively larger Belgian cities of Leuven and Denderleeuw may have also ended up being called "van Leeuwen" as well. Although translated as "lions" in modern Dutch, the place name may be explained originating from Germanic hlaiw, meaning (burial) mound. The name appeared in records since the 13th-century in Holland. People with this surname include:

 (1887–1991), Dutch composer and conductor
 Aletta van Leeuwen (1933–2001), Dutch poet and psychologist from the Netherlands Antilles
 Arie van Leeuwen (1910–2000), Dutch hurdler
 (1875–1953), Dutch-American flutist
 Bart van Leeuwen (1950–2017), Dutch photographer and author
 (1922–2007), Dutch-Antillian author and poet
 Bram van Leeuwen (1918–2001), Dutch businessman
 Dale van Leeuwen (born 1962), American Entrepreneur, Business Systems Application Development
 Denys van Leeuwen (1402–1471), Limburgian Roman Catholic theologian and mystic
 Dirk van Leeuwen (born 1945), Dutch Anglican clergyman
 Eugenie van Leeuwen (born 1970), Dutch cricketer
 Gerrit Johan van Leeuwen (1756–1825), Dutch fruit and flower painter 
 Hannie van Leeuwen (born 1926), Dutch CDA politician
 Hans van Leeuwen (born 1946), Dutch-American engineering professor
 Hans van Leeuwen (physicist) (born 1932), Dutch physicist
 Hendrika Johanna van Leeuwen (1887–1974), Dutch physicist, co-discoverer of the Bohr-van Leeuwen theorem
 Herman van Leeuwen (1884–1926), Dutch gymnast and high jumper
 Jan van Leeuwen (born 1946), Dutch computer scientist
 Jean Van Leeuwen (born 1937), American author of children's books
 Joke van Leeuwen (born 1952), Dutch author of children's books
 Laura van Leeuwen (born 1986), Dutch gymnast 
 Liz VanLeeuwen (1925–2022), American politician in the state of Oregon
 Marc van Leeuwen (born 1960), Dutch mathematician
 Martin van Leeuwen (born 1981), Dutch football defender
 Martine van Leeuwen (born 1968), Dutch competitive sailor
 Nans van Leeuwen (1900–1995), Dutch children's book illustrator and author
 Robbie van Leeuwen (born 1944), Dutch guitarist and founder of the band Shocking Blue
 Steven van Leeuwen, American (?) web publisher
 Theo van Leeuwen (born 1947), Dutch linguist and communication theorist
 Thomas van Leeuwen (born 1994), Dutch motorcycle racer.
 Troy Van Leeuwen (born 1970), American musician and producer
 Wietske van Leeuwen (born 1965), Dutch ceramist
 Wilfred van Leeuwen (born 1973), Dutch football manager
 Wilhelmus Frederik van Leeuwen (1860–1930), Dutch politician and Mayor of Amsterdam
Double-barreled surnames
 Arthur Docters van Leeuwen (born 1945), Dutch politician and jurist
Willem Marius Docters van Leeuwen (1880–1960), Dutch botanist and entomologist
 Jan Willem Storm van Leeuwen (born 1941), Dutch chemist

References

Dutch-language surnames
Surnames of Dutch origin
Toponymic surnames